The Medical Device Directive (Council Directive 93/42/EEC of 14 June 1993  concerning medical devices, OJ No L 169/1 of 1993-07-12) is intended to harmonise the laws relating to medical devices within the European Union. The MD Directive is a 'New Approach' Directive and consequently in order for a manufacturer to legally place a medical device on the European market the requirements of the MD Directive have to be met. Manufacturers' products meeting 'harmonised standards' have a presumption of conformity to the Directive. Products conforming with the MD Directive must have a CE mark applied. The Directive was most recently reviewed and amended by the 2007/47/EC and a number of changes were made. Compliance with the revised directive became mandatory on 21 March 2010.

The Medical Devices Directive is being repealed and replaced by the 2017 EU Medical Device Regulation (EU 2017/745), effective on 26 May 2021.

See also 
 European Medical Devices Industry Group
 Registration of medical devices in Italy

References

External links
UDI Webinar Series and how it will affect European Medical Device manufacturers
EU legislation summary
European Medical Device Usability Requirements
 Essential links for CE Marking in the UK

European Union directives
Regulation of medical devices
1993 in law
1993 in the European Union